The first Mongol invasion of Hungary started in March 1241, and the Mongols started to withdraw in late March 1242.

Background

Mongol invasion of Europe
The Hungarians had first learned about the Mongol threat in 1229, when King Andrew II granted asylum to some fleeing Russian boyars. Some Magyars (Hungarians), left behind during the main migration to the Pannonian basin, still lived on the banks of the upper Volga (it is believed by some that the descendants of this group are the modern-day Bashkirs, although this people now speaks a Turkic language, not Magyar). In 1237 a Dominican friar, Julianus, set off on an expedition to lead them back, and was sent back to King Béla with a letter from Batu Khan. In this letter, Batu called upon the Hungarian king to surrender his kingdom unconditionally to the Tatar forces or face complete destruction. Béla did not reply, and two more messages were later delivered to Hungary. The first, in 1239, was sent by the defeated Cuman tribes, who asked for and received asylum in Hungary. The second was sent in February 1241 from Poland which was facing an invasion from another Mongol force.

Cuman refugees
Following their defeat in 1239 soon after the Mongol invasion of Rus', many Cuman-Kipchak peoples were driven from their steppe further west or south. One such tribe was that of Khan Köten. According to Rogerius, Köten led a group consisting of 40,000 familias (a Latin phrase with multiple meanings) into Hungary. Some historians interpret this as Köten's tribe consisting of 40,000 families, though as pointed out by Hungarian historian András Pálóczi-Horváth the land the Cumans were expected to settle on could only support 17,000 families, suggesting Köten led 40,000 people in total. Köten sought asylum in the nearby kingdom of Hungary; the king responded that they could do so as long as the Cumans would convert to Catholicism and acknowledge him as their overlord, providing military service.

Köten agreed to Béla's conditions, promising to convert to Christianity and fight the Mongols (referred to as "Tatars" by the Hungarians). The king promptly gave them leave to settle in the plains along the Tisza River. However the Cumans, used to a nomadic and raid-based lifestyle, did not get on well with the sedentary population of Hungary. Many cases of robbery and rape were reported with Cumans as the perpetrators; Béla often refused to punish these transgressions, as he was reluctant to start a conflict with the Cumans, especially when he was already expecting a Mongol invasion. Townspeople also accused the Cumans of being agents of the Mongols.

Hungarian preparations

Invasion
Five separate Mongol armies invaded Hungary in 1241. The main army under Batu and Subutai crossed through the Verecke Pass. The army of Qadan and Büri crossed through the Borgói Pass. Two smaller forces under Böchek and the noyan Bogutai entered Hungary from the southeast. The army that had invaded Poland under Orda and Baidar invaded Hungary from the northwest.

Transylvania

Hungary

Mohi

Pest

Esztergom

Croatia

Mongol withdrawal

During the summer and autumn of 1241, most of the Mongol forces were resting on the Hungarian Plain. In late March, 1242, they began to withdraw. The most common reason given for this withdrawal is the Great Khan Ögedei's death on December 11, 1241, which supposedly forced the Mongols to retreat to Mongolia so that the princes of the blood could be present for the election of a new great khan. This is attested to by one primary source: the chronicle of Giovanni da Pian del Carpine, who after visiting the Mongol court, stated that the Mongols withdrew for this reason; he further stated that God had caused the Great Khan's death to protect Latin Christendom.

However, Rashid Al-Din, a high minister and historian of the Mongol Ilkhanate, specifically states that Batu did not know about Ogedei's death when he decided to withdraw. He states that they withdrew from Hungary to put down a Cuman rebellion, and then left Europe later in 1242 because they felt they had completed their mission, not because of the influence of any outside force. Rashid had access to the official Mongol history when writing the Ilkhanate's history (Altan Debter); additionally as historian John Andrew Boyle points out, the section where Rashid addresses the Mongol withdrawal from central Europe contains orthography that indicates he took this version of the events directly from earlier Mongol records. By Carpini's account, a messenger would have to be able to make the journey from Mongolia to Central Europe in a little over 3 months in the middle of winter. Carpini himself accompanied a Mongol party in a much shorter journey (from Kiev to Mongolia) during the summer and fall of 1246, where the party "made great speed" in order to reach the election ceremony in time, and made use of several horses per person while riding nearly all day and night. It took five months. The History of Yuan does not mention any particular reason for the withdrawal, but does note that Batu did not seek to attend a kurultai at all, and was only convinced to attend by Subutai in the year 1244, long after he had left Hungary.

The true reasons for the Mongol withdrawal are not fully known, but numerous plausible explanations exist. The Mongol invasion had bogged down into a series of costly and frustrating sieges, where they gained little loot and ran into stiff resistance. They had lost a large number of men despite their victories (see above). Finally, they were stretched thin in the European theater, and were experiencing a rebellion by the Cumans in what is now southern Russia, and the Caucasus (Batu returned to put it down, and spent roughly a year doing so). Another theory relates to Europe's weather: Hungary has a high water table and floods easily. An analysis of tree rings by modern researchers has found that Hungary had a cold wet winter in early 1242 (contributing to the famine), which likely turned Hungary's central plain into a huge swamp. Lacking pastures for their horses, the Mongols would have had to fall back to Russia in search of better grasslands.

Regardless of their reasons, the Mongols had completely withdrawn from Central Europe by mid-1242, though they still launched military operations in the west at this time, most notably the 1241–1243 Mongol invasion of Anatolia. After the withdrawal of the Mongol troops, Subutai was reassigned by Guyuk to engage the Southern Song, and died of old age in 1248.

Aftermath

Devastation of Hungary
The effects of the Mongol invasion were tremendous in the Kingdom of Hungary. The worst damage was incurred in the plains regions, where 50-80% of settlements were destroyed. The combination of massacres perpetrated by the Mongols, the famines induced by their foraging, and the simultaneous devastation of the countryside by the fleeing Cumans resulted in an estimated loss of 15–25% of Hungary's population, some 300,000–500,000 people in total. The only places that held in the face of Mongol assaults were approximately eighty fortified places, including all of the few stone castles in the kingdom. Among these places were Esztergom, Székesfehérvár, and the Pannonhalma Archabbey. However, these places were relatively few; a German chronicler in 1241 noted that Hungary "had almost no city protected by strong walls or fortresses", so the majority of settled areas were extremely vulnerable.

Reaction from other European rulers
While the king kept himself apprised of the situation in the rest of the country, he made numerous attempts to contact other rulers of Europe, including the Pope, the Holy Roman Emperor, and the King of France. None of them were willing to provide significant support to Hungary, either during or after the invasion. Pope Gregory XI called a Crusade against the Mongols, wrote to numerous German princes telling them to gather their forces, and ordered the clergy to give refuge to the Hungarian king and his subjects should they seek refuge from the Mongols. However, he warned the Hungarian king that help was unlikely to materialize as long as the Holy Roman Emperor remained belligerent and in conflict with the church.

His prediction was ultimately correct, as the Holy Roman Empire (HRE) took little part in fighting the Mongols, bar repelling minor scouting parties in Bohemia, Moravia, Bavaria, and Austria. Emperor Frederick II, in his warning letter to Christiandom, grimly assessed the situation but also tried to use it as leverage over the Papacy. However, Frederick was well aware of the threat they posed. Even before the Pope's summons, Emperor Frederick II and his son, Conrad IV, called a Landfrieden throughout Germany. Conrad ordered the magnates to levy their armies, while Frederick II ordered them to strengthen their defenses. The states of the Holy Roman Empire intended to bog the Mongols down laying siege to thousands of castles and fortified towns and fighting thousands of small sallying forces, rather than riding out to meet the Mongols in one large field battle as the Hungarians and Poles had done. A letter written by Emperor Frederick II, found in the Regesta Imperii, dated to June 20, 1241 and intended for all his vassals in Swabia, Austria, and Bohemia, included a number of specific military instructions. His forces were to avoid engaging the Mongols in field battles, hoard all food stocks in every fortress and stronghold, and arm all possible levies as well as the general populace. Duke Frederick of Austria paid to have Austria's border castles strengthened at his own expense. In Bohemia king Wenceslaus I had every castle strengthened and provisioned, as well as providing soldiers and armaments to monasteries in order to turn them into refuges for the civilian population. In the end these preparations were unnecessary, as the Mongols never launched a full-scale invasion of the Holy Roman Empire. There were Mongol raids and sieges in the HRE border states in the aftermath of their victories in Poland and Hungary, in which Frederick's instructions seemed to have been followed, but these were minor affairs and quickly abandoned.

The Duke of Austria and Styria, Frederick I, took advantage of the chaos of the invasion to occupy three Hungarian counties which he then had fortified. During the second half of 1242, following the Mongol withdrawal,
the Hungarians mustered their remaining troops and invaded the disputed counties. They would be fought over infrequently for the next four years, until the Battle of the Leitha River, where Frederick's death resulted in the counties being ceded to Hungary.

Hungarian reforms and future raids

While devastated, the kingdom of Hungary was intact. Within a year of the withdrawal of the Mongols, the three westernmost counties (Moson, Sopron, and Vas) that were extorted as ransom by Duke Frederick of Austria were recaptured, and a local uprising in Slavonia was quashed. In the decades following, the khans of the Golden Horde would repeatedly demand submission from Hungary – for example, Berke demanded once in 1259 and again in 1264 that Hungary become part of his empire and contribute its army to his planned invasion of central Europe in exchange for tax exemption and a share of the plunder – but were always ignored. The threat of another Mongol invasion, this time taken seriously, was the source of national unity and provided the impetus for Béla IV's extensive expansion of Hungarian defenses, especially the building of new stone castles (forty-four in the first ten years) and the revitalization of the army, including expanding the number of heavily armoured cavalry and knights in the royal army. Béla IV is seen now as a second founder of the nation, partly in recognition of all that was done during his reign to reconstruct and fortify the country against foreign invasion from the east. These improvements were to pay off in 1285 when Nogai Khan attempted an invasion of the country (raids along the frontier had been frequent in the intervening years, but Nogai's attack was the first major invasion since 1242). In that event, the invasion was defeated quickly, as were a number of other attacks before and after.

See also
Lament for the Destruction of Hungary by the Tartars

Notes

References
 Cartledge, Bryan (2011). A History of Hungary. C. Hurst & Co. .

 Salagean, Tudor (2016). Transylvania in the Second Half of the Thirteenth Century: The Rise of the Congregation System. Brill.
 Saunders, J. J. (1971). The History of the Mongol Conquests. London: Routledge & Kegan Paul.

 Sverdrup, Carl (2010). "Numbers in Mongol Warfare". Journal of Medieval Military History. Boydell Press. 8: 109–17 [p. 115]. . 

Hungary
Conflicts in 1241
Conflicts in 1242
1241 in Europe
1242 in Europe
Wars involving Hungary
Hungary
Hungary
13th-century military history of Croatia